Mary Gay Osceola (born March 16, 1939) is an American Seminole painter and printmaker known for her vibrant paintings, a number of which depict the lives of the Florida Seminole people. Osceola was born in Florida and educated in Bureau of Indian Affairs boarding schools. She studied at the Santa Fe Indian School from 1960 to 1961, followed by time at the Institute of American Indian Arts until 1965. Her work has been exhibited across the United States and is in the permanent collection of museums including the Gilcrease Museum and the National Museum of the American Indian.

References

20th-century American painters
20th-century indigenous painters of the Americas
Native American painters
20th-century American women artists
Seminole Tribe of Florida people
Painters from Florida
American women painters
20th-century Native American women
20th-century Native Americans
1939 births
Living people